The Amblève (French) or Amel (German) is a  long river in eastern Belgium in the province of Liège. It is a right tributary of the river Ourthe. It rises near Büllingen in the High Fens or Hoge Venen (Dutch), Hohes Venn (German), and Hautes Fagnes (French), close to the border with Germany.

Tributaries of the Amblève are the rivers Chefna, Ninglinspo, Warche, Eau Rouge, Salm and Lienne. The Amblève flows through the towns of Amel, Stavelot, Trois-Ponts, Remouchamps, and Aywaille. The Amblève joins the river Ourthe in Comblain-au-Pont.

Sites

The waterfall was created artificially in the 18th century when local monks cut through a bend in the river to feed a watermill. The dried out river bed is now used as the lower storage basin for the Coo-Trois-Ponts Hydroelectric Power Station.

A curiosity of Lorcé, a nearby village, is the unusual design of the dam located at a place called "Fang-Naze" or "Fagne-Naze."

On the right bank near Sprimont is the site of the Belle Roche cave, the oldest known place of human occupation of the Benelux (dating back about 500,000 years).

The "Fond de Quareux" stretch of the river near Nonceveux is listed as one of Wallonia's Major Heritage sites.

Rivers of the Ardennes (Belgium)
Rivers of Belgium
Rivers of Wallonia
Rivers of Liège Province
Comblain-au-Pont
Trois-Ponts
Stavelot
Rivers of the Eifel